"Come to Me" is the second single from Ricky Martin's greatest hits album, The Best of Ricky Martin (2001). Originally, the song was included on the 2000 album, Sound Loaded.

"Come to Me" was released on March 4, 2002 in selected European countries.

The song reached number ninety-two in the Netherlands in March 2002.

Sound Loaded also includes the Spanish-language version of "Come to Me", titled "Ven a Mí."

Formats and track listings
European CD single
"Come to Me" – 4:33
"Livin' la Vida Loca"  – 4:03

Charts

References

2002 singles
Ricky Martin songs
Songs written by Draco Rosa
2001 songs
Columbia Records singles
Song recordings produced by Emilio Estefan